Chris Judge may refer to:

 Christopher Judge (born 1964), American actor
 Chris Judge (archaeologist), archaeologist at the University of South Carolina Lancaster